Thomas Fitch, Jr. (October 14, 1612April 14, 1704) was a founding settler of Norwalk, Connecticut. He served as a deputy of the General Assembly of the Connecticut Colony representing Norwalk in the May 1673 session.

He was born October 14, 1612, in Bocking, Essex, England, the son of Thomas Fitch and Anna Reeve.

He emigrated from England in 1638. In Norwalk, he had the largest land holdings of any settler.

He served as town clerk of Norwalk from 1654 to 1658, from 1674 to 1677, from 1680 to 1682, and from 1686 to 1687.

He is listed on the Founders Stone bearing the names of the founding settlers of Norwalk in the East Norwalk Historical Cemetery.

References 

1612 births
1704 deaths
American Puritans
Burials in East Norwalk Historical Cemetery
City and town clerks
Deputies of the Connecticut General Assembly (1662–1698)
Founding settlers of Norwalk, Connecticut
People from Bocking, Essex